Lieutenant General Amarjeet Singh Bedi PVSM UYSM, YSM, VSM is the current Commander, IV Corps of the Indian Army and assumed office on 25 November 2016. He assumed the post from Lt General Devraj Anbu.

Early life and education 
Bedi has attended the Senior Command Course at Army War College, Mhow; Defence Service Staff College course at  Defence Services Staff College, Wellington;  Higher Command Course from National Defence University, Beijing and National Defence Course at National Defence College, Delhi.

Career 
Bedi was commissioned into The Garhwal Rifles on 13 June 1981. He has held various important Command, Staff and Instructor appointments during his career. He has commanded 'The Formidable Fifth' Brigade, oldest infantry brigade of the Indian Army, in Arunachal Pradesh; 3rd Infantry Division (Trishul Division) in Leh and General Officer Commanding (GOC), Bengal Area. He has held various staff appointments including Colonel General Staff (China) at HQ Army Training Command and Major General General staff at HQ Eastern Command.

During his career, he has been awarded the Vishisht Seva Medal (2012), the Yudh Seva Medal (2015) and the Uttam Yudh Seva Medal (2018) Param Vishisht Seva Medal (2020)for his service.

Honours and decorations

References 

Living people
Indian generals
Recipients of the Uttam Yudh Seva Medal
Recipients of the Yudh Seva Medal
Recipients of the Vishisht Seva Medal
Indian Army officers
Year of birth missing (living people)
National Defence College, India alumni
Recipients of the Param Vishisht Seva Medal
Army War College, Mhow alumni
Defence Services Staff College alumni